The 1939–40 Ranji Trophy was the sixth season of the Ranji Trophy. Eighteen teams took part in four zones in a knockout format. Northern India who appeared in the previous season dropped out but would return in 1940–41. Maharashtra won their first title defeating United Provinces in the final.

Highlights

 Vijay Hazare topped both the batting and bowling aggregates, emulating Amar Singh's feat in 1937–38. 
 Hazare's 316* against Baroda was the first triple century in Indian first class cricket. He scored 151 runs (165* – 316*) before lunch on the third day which is a record in Indian first class cricket, as of 2022. Maharashtra scored 240 runs in the session for the loss of one wicket; their last two wickets added 326 runs.
 Amar Singh scored 113* for Nawanagar v Baroda. He completed his 1000 runs in Ranji Trophy during this match. This was to be his 16th and last Ranji match as he would die in five months. He took his 100th wicket in 1938–39 and thus became the first player to do the 1000 run – 100 wicket double in Ranji Trophy. In 16 Ranji matches, Amar Singh scored 1009 runs at an average of 43, and 105 wickets at 15.48.
 The final was a timeless match. Maharashtra won on the fourth day.

Zonal Matches

West Zone

South Zone

East Zone

North Zone

Inter-Zonal Knockout Stage

Final

Scorecards and averages
Cricketarchive

References

External links

1940 in Indian cricket
Indian domestic cricket competitions